For the flower colloquially known as "Princess of the Night", see Epiphyllum oxypetalum.
"Princess of the Night" is a single by British heavy metal band Saxon, featured as the opening track and single from their 1981 album Denim and Leather; the song was written as a group production of all five members of the band at the time: Peter "Biff" Byford, Steve Dawson, Pete Gill, Graham Oliver, and Paul Quinn. The lyrics of the song deal with narrator's affinity of a steam locomotive of the LMS Princess Royal Class.

The single itself peaked in its popularity at 57 on the UK Singles Chart.

Background

Saxon are from Barnsley, an industrial town in north-central England with several railways, which, according to singer Biff Byford, is famous for "bus scrapyards". Byford said, "Princess of the Night is a song about a steam train that ends up on the scrapyard."

Personnel
Biff Byford – vocals
Paul Quinn – guitars (first guitar solo)
Graham Oliver – guitars (second guitar solo)
Steve Dawson – bass
Pete Gill – drums

References

1981 singles
Saxon (band) songs
Songs written by Pete Gill
1980 songs
Songs about trains
Capitol Records singles